Solo Piano II is an album by Chilly Gonzales which was released on August 27, 2012. The album features 14 original compositions for piano written and performed by Chilly Gonzales.

The album was named a longlisted nominee for the 2013 Polaris Music Prize on June 13, 2013.

Background
The ideas for the pieces were formed through improvisation and extensive note-taking of melodies and other musical ideas over years. His previous experience with jazz is noticeable, and some critics still compared him to Erik Satie. Four tracks, "White Keys", "Kenaston", "Othello" and "Train of Thought", were also recorded for "Pianovision" videos on YouTube and Vimeo, which give the viewer a top-down perspective of Chilly Gonzales' performance on the piano. Chilly Gonzales regularly allows his audience to closely watch him playing, as was the case for his first Solo Piano album tour, where a video camera directly above him projected his playing to a large screen that the audience can see.

Track listing

Charts

References

External links
 

2012 albums
Chilly Gonzales albums